Tweet and Lovely is a 1959 Warner Bros. Merrie Melodies cartoon directed by Friz Freleng. The short was released on July 18, 1959, and stars Tweety and Sylvester the Cat.

Plot 

Sylvester (who lives in an apartment building next to Tweety's yard) hears Tweety singing and looks through the window with his telescope. Tweety sees him, grabs a towel, exclaims "I taw I taw a peeping tom cat!", and shuts the door after saying "That nasty old peeping tom cat!".

Sylvester sees Hector the bulldog (called Spike in this film) sleeping next to the pole that holds Tweety's birdhouse. He sneaks and climbs the pole. Spike awakens and pulls him down. Sylvester smiles and pushes Hector's straight face into a happy face, but Spike changes his face to furious and chases him back to his apartment.

Sylvester uses a grabber to grab Tweety. Tweety avoids it until Spike climbs up a ladder and uses the grabber to knock Sylvester repeatedly against the wall, while Tweety scolds Sylvester saying, "Bad Old Puddy Tat!".

Sylvester builds a robot dog, but it attacks him, so he destroys it with a baseball bat.

Sylvester makes a smoke bomb and dashes into the smoke-covered yard, bumping into Spike, who then pounds him before sending him out of the yard.

Sylvester uses a pogo stick to approach Tweety's birdhouse, passing Spike and grabs Tweety. As he is about to pogo away, Spike opens a manhole. Sylvester falls in and he nicely makes Tweety escape but, Spike drops the lid with 4 holes on Sylvester's head.

Sylvester makes a storm cloud formula to prevent Spike from coming, but he trips, creating a storm in his room instead.

Sylvester makes himself invisible using vanishing cream, hits Spike with a brick and grabs Tweety. As Sylvester climbs down the pole, Tweety wonders why he is floating. Spike sprays Sylvester with green paint, forces him to give him Tweety and punches the cat out of the yard.

On the night, in a final attempt to get rid of Spike, Sylvester makes a bomb camera, but the stairs are too dark, because there is no light as Sylvester trips down causing it to explode. Sylvester appears with angel wings, rips up the blueprints saying "Hmph! It's a good thing pussycats have got 9 lives". Sylvester leaves the building.

References

External links

 
 

American comedy short films
1959 short films
1959 comedy films
1959 animated films
1950s fantasy comedy films
1950s English-language films
1950s Warner Bros. animated short films
American animated short films
American fantasy comedy films
American slapstick comedy films
Merrie Melodies short films
Sylvester the Cat films
Tweety films
Animated films about dogs
Films about pets
Animated films about revenge
Animated films set in the United States
Films set in apartment buildings
Films set in 1959
Short films directed by Friz Freleng
Films scored by Milt Franklyn
Warner Bros. Cartoons animated short films
Animated films about birds
Animated films about cats